Austin James Dean (born October 14, 1993) is an American professional baseball left fielder for the LG Twins of the KBO League. Dean was drafted by the Miami Marlins in the fourth round of the 2012 Major League Baseball draft. He made his MLB debut in 2018 with the Marlins, and has also played for the St. Louis Cardinals and San Francisco Giants.

Career
Dean was born in Spring, Texas. In his senior year at Klein Collins High School in Spring, Dean hit .379 with 10 doubles, 12 home runs, and 44 RBIs, and was a second team All American selection, while playing third base.

Miami Marlins
Dean was drafted by the Miami Marlins in the fourth round of the 2012 Major League Baseball draft out of high school. He signed for $367,200, forgoing his commitment to play college baseball at the University of Texas. The Marlins converted him from an infielder to an outfielder.

He made his professional debut in 2012 with the Rookie level Gulf Coast Marlins, batting .223/.337/.338 with two home runs and 15 RBIs in 148 at bats over 47 games. In 2013, he played for the Class A- Batavia Muckdogs and the Class A Greensboro Grasshoppers, batted a combined .262/.327/.416 with three home runs and 22 RBIs in 233 at bats over 63 total games. 

In 2014, he returned to Greensboro, slashing .308/.371/.444 with nine home runs and 58 RBIs in 403 at bats over 99 games. His 24.7% line drive percentage was third-best in the league. During the season he injured his right hand during a slide, later suffered a nasal fracture when he was hit by a pitch, and later again hit the injured list, this time with a groin strain.  

He spent 2015 with the Class A+ Jupiter Hammerheads where he batted .268/.318/.366 with 67 runs (4th in the Florida State League), a career-high 32 doubles (2nd), five home runs, 52 RBIs, 10 sacrifice flies (leading the league), and a career-high 18 stolen bases (though he was caught stealing 10 times) in 515 at bats over 136 games. In the Arizona Fall League, playing for Mesa he batted .323/.364/.452 with one home run and seven RBIs in 62 at bats. He was an AFL Rising Star in 2015.

He spent 2016 with the AA Jacksonville Jumbo Shrimp where he compiled a .238/.307/.375 slash line with 11 home runs and 67 RBIs in 480 at bats over 130 games. He was a Southern mid-season All Star and an MILB.com Organization All Star in 2016. He spent 2017 back with Jacksonville where he batted .282/.323/.427 with four home runs and 30 RBIs in 234 at bats over 61 games. He broke his right hand in an outfield collision, and missed almost three months of the season.

Dean made his Major League debut on August 15, 2018, against the Atlanta Braves, going 0-for-3. In his first Major League season, Dean hit .221/.279/.363 with 16 runs scored, four home runs, and 14 RBIs in 113 at bats over 34 games in left field. In 2018 in the minors for Jacksonville and AAA New Orleans he batted .345/.410/.511 with 71 runs, 12 homes runs, and 68 RBIs in 397 at bats over 109 games. He was an MILB.com Organization All Star in 2018.

In 2019 with Miami he batted .225/.261/.404 with 6 home runs and 21 RBIs in 178 at bats. That season with New Orleans he batted .337/.401/.635 with 18 home runs and 57 RBIs in 252 at bats over 73 games; he also was one-for-three for the GCL Marlins.

St. Louis Cardinals
On January 14, 2020, Dean was traded to the St. Louis Cardinals for Diowill Burgos. He appeared in only three games during the season, going one-for-four with three walks, while missing time due to injury. During the season he was put on the injured list with a right elbow strain.

In 2021 with the St. Louis Cardinals he batted .233/.342/.400 with one home run and 7 RBIs in 
30 at bats in 22 games. In the minors, with AAA Memphis and Class A Palm Beach he batted .246/.368/.456 with two home runs and 10 RBIs in 87 at bats in 18 games. During the season he suffered a fractured left wrist.

Through 2021, in the major leagues he had played 83 games in left field, 9 in right field, and 6 at first base. In the minors he had played 491 games in left field, 142 in right field, 26 at first base, and 14 in center field.

San Francisco Giants
On November 5, 2021, Dean was claimed off waivers by the San Francisco Giants. He was designated for assignment on March 20, 2022, to create room for the newly signed Matthew Boyd, and sent to AAA on March 27.  

With AAA Sacramento in 2022, he batted .268/.345/.467 in 392 at bats, with 68 runs, 5 triples (10th in the Pacific Coast League), 17 home runs, 55 RBIs, and 10 stolen bases in 12 attempts. He played 59 games in right field, 27 in left field, 16 at DH, 8 in center field, and 6 at first base. With the Giants, he batted 3-for-8 with a walk.

LG Twins
On December 22, 2022, Dean signed with the LG Twins of the KBO League.

References

External links

1993 births
Living people
People from Spring, Texas
Sportspeople from Harris County, Texas
Baseball players from Texas
Major League Baseball outfielders
Miami Marlins players
St. Louis Cardinals players
San Francisco Giants players
Gulf Coast Marlins players
Batavia Muckdogs players
Greensboro Grasshoppers players
Jupiter Hammerheads players
Mesa Solar Sox players
Jacksonville Suns players
Jacksonville Jumbo Shrimp players
New Orleans Baby Cakes players